Bernd Fabritius (born 14 May 1965) is a German politician of the Christian Social Union of Bavaria (CSU) who has served as a Member of the Bundestag from 2013 to 2017 and again in 2021.

Early life and education
Fabritius was born in Agnita, Sibiu County, Romania, and is a Transylvanian Saxon. He left communist Romania with his family in 1984; he has said his family and other Romanian Germans left Romania with a heavy heart and only due to state pressure of the then-communist regime. From 1985, he studied at the Bavarian University of Applied Sciences for Public Administration and Legal Affairs (FHVR). In 1996 he graduated in law from the Ludwig Maximilian University of Munich.

Member of the German Bundestag, 2013–2017
Fabritius was elected to the German Bundestag in the 2013 federal elections. He served on the Committee on Foreign Affairs, its Sub-Committee on Foreign Cultural and Educational Policies, and on the Committee on Human Rights and Humanitarian Aid. On the Committee on Human Rights and Humanitarian Aid, he was his parliamentary group's rapporteur on discrimination.

Between 2014 and 2015, Fabritius was also a member of the Committee on Affairs of the European Union, where he served as his parliamentary group's rapporteur on relations with Ukraine and Romania. In 2015, he succeeded Peter Gauweiler as Chairman of the Sub-Committee on Foreign Cultural and Educational Policies. In addition to his committee assignments, he served as deputy chairman of the German-Romanian Parliamentary Friendship Group and as member of the German-Canadian Parliamentary Friendship Group and of the German-US Parliamentary Friendship Group.

From 2014 to mid-2015, Fabritius briefly served as a full member of the German delegation to the Parliamentary Assembly of the Council of Europe, where he sat on the Committee on Legal Affairs and Human Rights and on the Sub-Committee on the Rights of Minorities. Between 2015 and 2016, he served as the Assemby’s rapporteur on the rule of law in South-East European countries. From 2016, he was the rapporteur on the reform of Interpol and the rule of law in south-east European countries.

In November 2014, Fabritius was elected President of the Federation of Expellees (BdV), succeeding Erika Steinbach. He has described his goal as the organisation's leader as representing the interests of all people with roots in Eastern Europe and South Eastern Europe and as building bridges with those countries. While the Federation of Expellees has traditionally focused on the expellees of the 1940s, Fabritius has said he will also place emphasis on recent emigrants from Eastern Europe such as the Romanian Germans.

Under the umbrella of the German parliaments’ godparenthood program for human rights activists, Fabritius has been raising awareness for the work of persecuted Ukrainian filmmaker and writer Oleg Sentsov since 2015.

Other activities

Corporate boards
 Autohaus Michael Schmidt GmbH, Member of the Advisory Board
 Honterus-Verlag, Member of the Supervisory Board

Non-profits
 Bavaria-Romania for Social Assistance in Romania, Co-Founder
 Carl Wolff Gesellschaft, Member of the Board of Trustees
 Foundation Flight, Expulsion, Reconciliation, Member of the Board of Trustees
 German Institute for Human Rights (DIMR), Member of the Board of Trustees
 Goethe-Institut, Member of the General Meeting
 Magnus Hirschfeld Foundation, Member of the Board of Trustees
 ZDF, Member of the Television Board (representing the Federation of Expellees)

Political positions
In June 2017, Fabritius was one of only seven CSU members who voted in favor of Germany’s introduction of same-sex marriage.

Personal life
Fabritius lives in a civil union with his partner; it became publicly known that he is gay in 2014.

References 

1965 births
Living people
German people of German-Romanian descent
Members of the Bundestag for Bavaria
People from Sibiu County
Naturalized citizens of Germany
Romanian emigrants to Germany
Romanian Lutherans
Transylvanian Saxon people
LGBT members of the Bundestag
Gay politicians
LGBT Lutherans
Members of the Bundestag 2013–2017
Members of the Bundestag for the Christian Social Union in Bavaria
21st-century LGBT people